Milton Carruth (March 23, 1899 – September 7, 1972) was an American film editor and, for a period in the 1930s, film director. Among the 129 films he edited are All Quiet on the Western Front (directed by Lewis Milestone, 1930 (silent version)), Shadow of a Doubt (directed by Alfred Hitchcock, 1943), Pillow Talk (directed by Michael Gordon, 1959), and Imitation of Life (directed by Douglas Sirk, 1959). His career as an editor spanned nearly four decades, from 1929 through 1966 (The Pad and How to Use It (directed by Brian G. Hutton, 1966).

In 1937 and 1938, he directed seven films: Love Letters of a Star, She's Dangerous, Breezing Home, The Man in Blue, Reported Missing!, The Lady Fights Back and Some Blondes Are Dangerous. Following these he returned to his "first love", which was film editing.

Carruth spent his entire career working at Universal Studios; he was "one of three editors who served as the core of Universal's editing department for a span of some forty years". He had been selected as a member of the American Cinema Editors.

References

External links
 

1899 births
1972 deaths
American film directors
American film editors
American Cinema Editors